Alexander Alexandrovich Avtsin (born March 19, 1991) is a Russian professional ice hockey right wing who is currently playing for HC 21 Prešov in Slovak Extraliga.

Playing career
Avtsin was drafted by the Montreal Canadiens in the fourth round of the 2009 entry draft, 109th overall while within the HC Dynamo Moscow organization in the Kontinental Hockey League. He was also drafted 43rd overall in the Canadian Hockey League draft by the Quebec Remparts, but opted to remain in Russia.

On July 2, 2010, Avtsin came to a mutual agreement with HC Dynamo Moscow to leave the team. He plans on going to Montreal for training camp and if he does not make the team is willing to play for the Canadiens' farm team, the Hamilton Bulldogs.

On July 15, 2010, Avtsin agreed to terms on a three-years entry-level contract with the Montreal Canadiens. In the 2012–13 season, his third year with Canadiens affiliate the Bulldogs, after just 15 games Avtsin agreed to mutually terminate the remainder of his contract and on May 3, 2013 after clearing waivers was released as a free agent.

On July 11, 2013, Avtsin agreed to a contract to return to the KHL with Lokomotiv Yaroslavl.

After two seasons with Traktor Chelyabinsk, Avtsin left as a free agent and signed a one-year contract for the 2021–22 season to continue in the KHL with Spartak Moscow on 19 June 2021. In a checking line role, Avtsin made 36 regular season appearances with Spartak, posting 1 goal and 4 points.

As a free agent from Spartak, Avtsin secured a one-year contract to join HC Vityaz on 5 May 2022.

Personal
He is married and has a daughter.

Career statistics

References

External links
 
 Alexander Avtsin profile at RussianProspect.com

1991 births
Living people
Admiral Vladivostok players
Chelmet Chelyabinsk players
HC Dynamo Moscow players
Hamilton Bulldogs (AHL) players
Lokomotiv Yaroslavl players
Montreal Canadiens draft picks
HC Neftekhimik Nizhnekamsk players
Russian ice hockey right wingers
Severstal Cherepovets players
HC Spartak Moscow players
Traktor Chelyabinsk players
HC Vityaz players
HC 21 Prešov players
Russian expatriate sportspeople in Slovakia
Russian expatriate sportspeople in Canada
Expatriate ice hockey players in Canada
Expatriate ice hockey players in Slovakia
Russian expatriate ice hockey people